William Clyde Yohe (September 2, 1878 – December 24, 1938) was a professional baseball player. He played one season in Major League Baseball for the Washington Senators for 21 games during the 1909 Washington Senators season, primarily as a third baseman.

External links

http://www.baseball-almanac.com/players/player.php?p=yohebi01

Major League Baseball third basemen
Washington Senators (1901–1960) players
Iola Grays players
Cherryvale Boosters players
Temple Boll Weevils players
Waco Navigators players
Shreveport Pirates (baseball) players
Galveston Sand Crabs players
Kansas City Blues (baseball) players
Montgomery Climbers players
Oklahoma City Indians players
San Francisco Seals (baseball) players
Victoria Bees players
Tacoma Tigers players
Spokane Indians players
Moose Jaw Robin Hoods players
Seattle Giants players
Minor league baseball managers
Baseball players from Illinois
1878 births
1938 deaths